Michael James Tournier (Mike Tournier) (born 24 May 1963, High Wycombe, Buckinghamshire, England) is an English electronic musician, and one of the co-founders of the electronic music group Fluke, along with Mike Bryant and Jon Fugler. He first met with other members of Fluke in High Wycombe where he had been involved, along with Jon Fugler, in a band called Skin; the lineup to this band consisting of Tournier, Fugler, Mike Bryant, Karen Smith, and Guy Lewis. They were managed by Julian Nugent.

Life and career
Tournier attended the John Hampden Grammar School, High Wycombe. Little information is known of Tournier's history prior to his incorporation into Fluke in 1988 at the age of 25 in Beaconsfield, Buckinghamshire, and remains a high point in his career. The band's conception was influenced by Tournier's interest in acid house music and particularly Cabaret Voltaire and Giorgio Moroder. Tournier stayed with Fluke until approximately 1998 when he left the group to collaborate with Jan Burton on Syntax's Meccano Mind. This was to be a short lived partnership with Syntax splitting up after only a single album and two singles.

Touriner's music has spanned many different genres throughout his career, which he has not seen as a problem, stating "I think it just goes to show that what you want out of music isn't necessarily as narrow minded as it being just guitars, or computers, it's about feeling."

References

External links
Mike Tournier Myspace page

1963 births
Living people
English electronic musicians
English keyboardists
English record producers
Fluke (band) members
People from High Wycombe